White Shield is a census-designated place (CDP) lying within the boundaries of the Mandan, Hidatsa, and Arikara Nation. It is located "on" the Fort Berthold Indian Reservation in McLean County, North Dakota, United States. The population was 336 at the 2010 census. It is considered the primary community of the Arikara (Sahnish) people and is named for Chief White Shield.

White Shield was founded in 1954 to replace the town of Elbowoods (Arikara: hiswíkAt, which was inundated by the creation of Lake Sakakawea. The name honors White Shield, an Arikara chief and a scout for General George Armstrong Custer.

Geography
White Shield is located at  (47.661351, -101.845248).

Culture 
As of 2014, White Shield's Arikara language speakers are active in language revitalization. The Arikara language is taught at Fort Berthold Community College, White Shield School, and at the Arikara Cultural Center.

Demographics

As of the census of 2000, there were 348 people, 100 households, and 79 families residing in the CDP. The population density was 92.9 people per square mile (35.8/km). There were 108 housing units at an average density of 28.8/sq mi (11.1/km). The racial makeup of the CDP was 1.15% White, 98.56% Native American, and 0.29% from two or more races. Hispanic or Latino of any race were 11.78% of the population.

There were 100 households, out of which 52.0% had children under the age of 18 living with them, 33.0% were married couples living together, 33.0% had a female householder with no husband present, and 21.0% were non-families. 20.0% of all households were made up of individuals, and 5.0% had someone living alone who was 65 years of age or older. The average household size was 3.48 and the average family size was 3.89.

In the CDP, the population was spread out, with 43.1% under the age of 18, 10.6% from 18 to 24, 23.6% from 25 to 44, 17.5% from 45 to 64, and 5.2% who were 65 years of age or older. The median age was 23 years. For every 100 females, there were 86.1 males. For every 100 females age 18 and over, there were 88.6 males.

The median income for a household in the CDP was $15,625, and the median income for a family was $15,625. Males had a median income of $15,625 versus $12,159 for females. The per capita income for the CDP was $6,603. About 45.7% of families and 56.2% of the population were below the poverty line, including 68.8% of those under age 18 and 53.3% of those age 65 or over.

Public safety
In 2020 the nearest fire station was in Garrison and the nearest police station was in New Town. In 2020 there were plans to establish a joint police and fire station.

Education
It is served by White Shield School District.

Notable people 
 Carol Juneau - American politician from Montana. Former member of Montana House of Representatives and former Montana Senate. Born in Elbowoods.

References

Census-designated places in McLean County, North Dakota
Census-designated places in North Dakota
Populated places established in 1954
Mandan, Hidatsa, and Arikara Nation
1954 establishments in North Dakota